Li Shangfu (born February 1958) is a Chinese aerospace engineer and general of the People's Liberation Army (PLA). Li is currently a State Councilor of the People's Republic of China and the Minister of National Defence since March 2023.

He previously served as Deputy Commander of the PLA Strategic Support Force and Deputy Commander of the PLA General Armaments Department. He spent 31 years working at the Xichang Satellite Launch Center, including 10 years as its director. He later served as head of the Equipment Development Department of the Central Military Commission from 2017 to 2022.

Early life
Li Shangfu was born in February 1958 in Chengdu, Sichuan Province, with his ancestral home in Xingguo County, Jiangxi Province. He is the son of Li Shaozhu, a Red Army veteran and former high-ranking officer of the PLA Railway Force. Li Shangfu joined the PLA when he entered the National University of Defense Technology in 1978. After graduating in 1982, he began working at the Xichang Satellite Launch Center as a technician.

Career 
In December 2003, he was promoted to Director (Commander) of the center at the age of 45. In 2006, he attained the rank of major general. In his ten years as director of the Xichang center, Li oversaw several rocket launches, including the launch of the Chang'e 2 lunar probe in October 2010.

After 31 years working in Xichang, Li was appointed Chief of Staff of the PLA General Armaments Department (GAD) in 2013, replacing Major General Shang Hong. A year later, he was made Deputy Director of the GAD.

In 2016, Li was appointed Deputy Commander of the newly established PLA Strategic Support Force, which is responsible for cyberspace, space, and other high-tech warfare. He was promoted to the rank of lieutenant general in the same year. In September 2017, Li was appointed Director of the Equipment Development Department of the Central Military Commission, the successor department of the GAD, replacing General Zhang Youxia.

In October 2017, Li was elected a member of the 19th Central Committee of the Chinese Communist Party.

On 20 September 2018, Li Shangfu, along with the Equipment Development Department, were sanctioned by the U.S. government for "engaging in significant transactions with persons" sanctioned under CAATSA, namely for transactions that involved ″Russia's transfer to China of Su-35 combat aircraft and S-400 surface-to-air missile system-related equipment″.

In October 2022, he was elected as a member of the 20th Central Military Commission of the Communist Party of China. He ranked first among the members of the Central Military Commission.

On January 18, 2023, Li Shangfu attended the Central Military Commission promotion ceremony, and was appointed State Councilor and Minister of National Defense on March 12 of the same year, succeeding Wei Fenghe.

References

1958 births
Living people
People's Liberation Army generals from Sichuan
People from Chengdu
Members of the 19th Central Committee of the Chinese Communist Party
National University of Defense Technology alumni
Chinese aerospace engineers
Engineers from Sichuan
State councillors of China
Ministers of National Defense of the People's Republic of China
Chinese individuals subject to U.S. Department of the Treasury sanctions